The 2018 Lingshui China Masters was a badminton tournament which took place at Agile Stadium in China from 10 to 15 April 2018 and had a total purse of $75,000.

Tournament
The 2018 Lingshui China Masters was the second Super 100 tournament of the 2018 BWF World Tour and also part of the Lingshui China Masters championships, which had been held since 2001. This tournament was organized by the Chinese Badminton Association with the sanction from the Badminton Asia and BWF.

Venue
This international tournament was held at Agile Stadium which located inside the Lingshui Culture and Sports Square in Lingshui, Hainan, China.

Point distribution
Below is the point distribution for each phase of the tournament based on the BWF points system for the BWF Tour Super 100 event.

Prize money
The total prize money for this tournament was US$75,000. Distribution of prize money was in accordance with BWF regulations.

Men's singles

Seeds

 Hsu Jen-hao (third round)
 Liew Daren (quarter-finals)
 Ihsan Maulana Mustofa (third round)
 Lee Zii Jia (second round)
 Nguyễn Tiến Minh (second round)
 Chong Wei Feng (semi-finals)
 Iskandar Zulkarnain (quarter-finals)
 Pannawit Thongnuam (third round)

Finals

Top half

Section 1

Section 2

Bottom half

Section 3

Section 4

Women's singles

Seeds

 Chen Su-yu (second round)
 Vũ Thị Trang (second round)
 Sung Shuo-yun (quarter-finals)
 Sri Krishna Priya Kudaravalli (withdrew)
 Yulia Yosephin Susanto (withdrew)
 Sai Uttejitha Rao Chukka (withdrew)
 Cai Yanyan (quarter-finals)
 Thamolwan Poopradubsil (first round)

Finals

Top half

Section 1

Section 2

Bottom half

Section 3

Section 4

Men's doubles

Seeds

 Han Chengkai / Zhou Haodong (champions)
 Po Li-wei / Yang Ming-tse (semi-finals)
 Park Kyung-hoon / Choi Hyuk-gyun (quarter-finals)
 Chai Biao / Wang Zekang (second round)

Finals

Top half

Section 1

Section 2

Bottom half

Section 3

Section 4

Women's doubles

Seeds

 Chayanit Chaladchalam / Phataimas Muenwong (semi-finals)
 Chiang Kai-hsin / Hung Shih-han (second round)
 Du Yue / Li Yinhui (champions)
 Chang Ching-hui / Yang Ching-tun (second round)

Finals

Top half

Section 1

Section 2

Bottom half

Section 3

Section 4

Mixed doubles

Seeds

 Ronald Alexander / Annisa Saufika (final)
 Po Li-wei / Chang Ching-hui (second round)
 Wu Yuan-cheng / Yang Ching-tun (second round)
 Chang Ko-chi / Cheng Chi-ya (quarter-finals)

Finals

Top half

Section 1

Section 2

Bottom half

Section 3

Section 4

References

External links
 Tournament Link

Lingshui China Masters
Lingshui China Masters
Lingshui China Masters
Lingshui China Masters